Michel Doukeris (born 1973) is a Brazilian businessman, and the CEO of AB InBev, the world's largest beer company.

Doukeris was born in Lages, Brazil, in 1973. He earned a degree in chemical engineering from Federal University of Santa Catarina, and a master's degree from Fundação Getulio Vargas. He has attended postgraduate programmes at the Wharton School and Kellogg School of Management in the US.

Doukeris joined AB InBev in 1996 and worked in Latin America before he led its China and Asia Pacific operations for seven years. In 2016 became global chief sales officer, based in the US. In January 2018, he became the leader of Anheuser-Busch and AB InBev's North American business.

In July 2021, Doukeris succeeded Carlos Brito, who had been CEO of AB InBev for 15 years.

References

Living people
AB InBev people
Brazilian chief executives
Fundação Getulio Vargas alumni
People from Lages
Federal University of Santa Catarina alumni
1973 births